Huraa may refer to:
 Huraa (Haa Alif Atoll), Maldives
 Huraa (Kaafu Atoll), Maldives
 Huraa dynasty, the former ruling dynasty of the Maldives

See also
Hura (disambiguation)